San Jose is a census-designated place in San Miguel County, New Mexico, United States. Its population was 137 as of the 2010 census. San Jose has a post office, with ZIP code 87565. Exit 319 of Interstate 25 serves the community.

San Jose was founded in 1803 when allotments of land were made to 45 men and two women by the Spanish government of New Mexico. The purpose of the settlement, and others in the Pecos River valley, was to defend the eastern flanks of the New Mexican settlements from Indian attacks, especially by the Apaches. Many of the early settlers were landless genizaros.  Many of the comancheros and ciboleros who traded with the Comanche and hunted bison on the Great Plains came from San Jose and other Pecos Valley settlements.

Geography

Education
It is in the West Las Vegas Schools school district. West Las Vegas High School is the area high school.

See also
 San Miguel del Vado 
 San Miguel del Vado Land Grant

References

Census-designated places in New Mexico
Census-designated places in San Miguel County, New Mexico